Warburg/Zajes Airport  is located  north of Warburg, Alberta, Canada.

See also
 List of airports in the Edmonton Metropolitan Region

References

Registered aerodromes in Alberta
Leduc County